Ravensburg-Weingarten University of Applied Sciences (RWU) (German: Hochschule Ravensburg-Weingarten) is a public university in the city of Weingarten, in the southern part of the German state of Baden-Württemberg. The university was founded in 1962 and tracks advanced fields in Applied Physics and Process Engineering, Electrical Engineering and Computer Science, Automotive and Mechatronics Engineering, Mechanical Engineering and Business & Technology Management as well as Social Work and Healthcare Management. The university has a very good reputation regarding engineering and technology studies; according to CHE ranking, published weekly by major German newspaper Die Zeit, RWU frequently ranks among the top universities in the fields of mechanical and electrical engineering, as well as computer science.

History 

In 1962, Baden-Wuerttemberg Parliament decided to build a State School of Engineering (SIS) in Ravensburg with two departments, Mechanical Engineering and Physical Engineering. In 1967, the first students subsequently graduated as engineers. In 1971, The State Schools of Engineering become Fachhochschulen, commonly known as Universities of Applied Sciences English. In 1974, the Ministry of Education decided the establishment of two new faculties: Electronics and Business Administration. The university was further extended with the introduction of the Electronics program as part of the Physical Engineering department in May 1974.

Today, Ravensburg-Weingarten University offers 35 undergraduate and graduate degree programs in German and English in four faculties: The Faculty of Electrical Engineering and Computer Science, the Faculty of Mechanical Engineering, the Faculty of Technology and Management and the Faculty of Social Work, Health and Nursing. RWU employs 296 academic and administrative staff members.

PLUS studies 
In cooperation with the near Weingarten University of Education which specializes in teachers' education, the university provides some courses leading to a double graduation with a bachelor's degree in Engineering and an additionally possibility to obtain a university degree in Teaching at professional schools.

Structure 
The university is divided into several departments which provide a broad range of Engineering, Social Work and Management courses:

 Department of Electrical Engineering and Computer Science
 Department of Mechanical Engineering
 Department of Social Work and Healthcare Management
 Department of Technology and Management

References

External links 

 Website of Ravensburg-Weingarten University of Applied Sciences

Universities of Applied Sciences in Germany
Universities and colleges in Baden-Württemberg
Educational institutions established in 1964
1964 establishments in Germany